Jajouka, Something Good Comes to You is a 2012 mockumentary film directed by Marc Hurtado and Éric Hurtado.

Synopsis 
In the form of a folk tale, the film examines ancient musical legends in Jajouka, a village nestled high in the Rif Mountains.

References

External links 
 

French mockumentary films
2012 films
2010s French films